Peter Campbell (born 10 November 1950) is an Australian former professional tennis player. He was previously a women's coach at the Australian Institute of Sport in Canberra.

A native of Melbourne, Campbell played collegiate tennis for UC Berkeley during the early 1970s. He spent the rest of the decade on the professional tour. In 1975 he pushed Ken Rosewall to three sets at the NSW Open and in 1977 he teamed up with John Holladay to make the doubles third round at Wimbledon.

ATP Challenger finals

Doubles: 1 (0–1)

References

External links
 
 

1950 births
Living people
Australian male tennis players
Australian tennis coaches
California Golden Bears men's tennis players
Tennis players from Melbourne